Kuldeep Yadav (born 14 December 1994) is an Indian international cricketer. He is a bowling all-rounder who bowls Left-arm Unorthodox spin bowler is and a capable Lower order batter who plays for India and for Uttar Pradesh in domestic cricket. He was signed by the Delhi Capitals for the Indian premiere league. He has played for the Indian Under-19 cricket team and played in the 2014 Under-19 Cricket World Cup. On 18 December 2019, against the West Indies, he became the first bowler for India to take two hat-tricks in international cricket. On 17 January 2020, in the second ODI against Australia, Yadav became the fastest spin bowler for India, in terms of innings, to take 100 wickets in ODI cricket, in his 58th innings.

Early and domestic career

Yadav was born in Unnao but raised in Kanpur, Uttar Pradesh, the son of a brick kiln owner. In an interview, he revealed that it was his father who wanted him to continue playing cricket and even took him to a coach (Kapil Pandey). Inspired by bowling greats Wasim Akram and Zaheer Khan, he wanted to become a left-arm seamer. However, given his slight build, his coach insisted on him becoming a wrist-spin bowler as he was impressed with the turn and variations he was providing unknowingly at the trials. Since then, he started following and watching videos of Shane Warne's bowling and made him his role model.

Yadav also revealed that earlier in his life, there was a dark phase in his life when he thought of giving up cricket and committing suicide, when he was not selected in the Uttar Pradesh’s under-15 team.

Yadav was a member of the Mumbai Indians squad in 2012 and signed up by the Kolkata Knight Riders in 2014, whom he represented at the 2014 Champions League Twenty20.

In January 2018, Yadav was bought back by KKR in the 2018 IPL auction. In February 2022, he was bought by the Delhi Capitals in the auction for the 2022 Indian Premier League tournament.

International career
Yadav was selected in the Indian cricket team to play against West Indies in October 2014 but did not appear in any match. In February 2017, he was added to India's Test squad for their one-off match against Bangladesh. He made his Test debut for India against Australia on 25 March 2017, at the Dharamshala Cricket Stadium, taking four wickets in the first innings. Yadav is the first left-arm wrist spin bowler to represent India national cricket team in Test cricket. He is also only the third such bowler in Test cricket to take four wickets on debut.

In June 2017, Yadav was named in India's squad for a limited overs tour to the West Indies. He made his One Day International (ODI) debut for India against the West Indies on 23 June 2017. However, during this game, he was unable to bowl a single delivery as the game ended with no result due to rain during the first innings while India was batting. He was ultimately able to bowl in the next match of the series, where he took three wickets. He made his Twenty20 International (T20I) debut for India against the West Indies on 9 July 2017.

On 21 September 2017, Yadav became the third bowler for India to take a hat-trick in an ODI after Chetan Sharma and Kapil Dev. He took the hat-trick at Eden Gardens, Kolkata, against Australia.

On 3 July 2018, Yadav took his first five-for in a T20I and also became the first left-arm wrist-spin bowler to take five wickets in a T20I during the first T20I against England, in fact he also became only the third Indian after Yuzvendra Chahal and Bhuvneshwar Kumar to take a five-wicket haul in a T20I.

On 12 July 2018, during the first ODI against England, Yadav grabbed his maiden five-wicket haul in an ODI and also set a new record for registering the best bowling figures by a left-arm spin bowler of any kind in an ODI (6/25). He also shattered the record of Shahid Afridi for registering the best bowling figures by a spinner against England in ODIs and also broke Afridi's record for recording the best ever bowling figures by a spinner in an ODI in England.

On 6 October 2018, in the first test against West Indies, Yadav took his first five-wicket haul in Tests.

After an impressive outing against Australia, in the T20I series of India tour of Australia 2018/19, Kuldeep jumped 20 places to claim a career-best third position in the MRF ICC T20I Bowlers Rankings, updated on 26 November 2018.

On 6 January 2019, in the fourth Test against Australia at the SCG and in Yadav's first Test match on Australian soil, he took his second five-wicket haul (5/99) in Tests, in Australia's first innings.

On 11 February 2019, Yadav moved to second position in the T20I Bowlers Rankings. In April 2019, he was named in India's squad for the 2019 Cricket World Cup. On 30 June 2019, in the match against England, Kuldeep played in his 50th ODI. On 18 December 2019, against West Indies he became the first bowler for India to take two hat-tricks in ODIs.

References

External links

 
 Kuldeep Yadav's profile page on Wisden

1994 births
Living people
Indian cricketers
India Test cricketers
India One Day International cricketers
India Twenty20 International cricketers
Uttar Pradesh cricketers
Kolkata Knight Riders cricketers
India Red cricketers
One Day International hat-trick takers
Cricketers at the 2019 Cricket World Cup
Delhi Capitals cricketers